Who Killed Teddy Bear is a 1965 American neo-noir crime thriller film, directed by Joseph Cates and starring Sal Mineo, Juliet Prowse, Jan Murray and Elaine Stritch. The film was written by Arnold Drake and Leon Tokatyan.

Plot
Norah Dain (Juliet Prowse), a nightclub disc jockey and aspiring actress living alone in a Manhattan apartment, receives a series of obscene phone calls from someone who seems to be watching her on a daily basis. She also finds a decapitated teddy bear in her apartment. At first it is not clear to either the viewer or Norah who is making the calls. A police detective, Lt. Dave Madden (Jan Murray), whose own wife was raped and murdered, takes a personal interest in Norah and her case. Lt. Madden engages in suspicious behavior such as suggesting to Norah several times that he himself could be the caller, secretly tape recording his discussions with Norah, listening to tapes of Norah and other women talking about obscene phone calls, and obsessively studying pornography and the behavior of sex perverts, despite the fact that he is exposing his ten-year-old daughter to such adult concepts and he is being reported to his superiors at work.

However, midway through the film, it is revealed to the audience (but not to Norah) that the obscene caller is actually Lawrence Sherman (Sal Mineo), a waiter at the nightclub where Norah works. Lawrence lives with and cares for his 19-year-old sister Edie (Margot Bennett), who is brain damaged and has the mind of a child. Edie's brain damage is apparently the result of an accident when she was a little girl and saw her older brother, Lawrence, having sex with an unidentified older woman (possibly their mother, although this is not made clear); she ran away in horror or fear and fell down the stairs. Lawrence is unable to have a normal romantic or sexual relationship due to his guilt over the accident and his duty to look after Edie following the death of their parents. He is also frustrated when Edie dresses up in an adult dress, high heels and makeup and seems to make advances towards him. He tries to get rid of his frustration by visiting adult bookstores and movies in Times Square, but still is obsessed with watching and calling Norah. Despite Lt. Madden's warnings that the caller might be someone Norah knows, Norah never suspects Lawrence until it is too late.  Instead she is friendly to him and even attracted to him, complimenting him on his body when they meet at the gym, and offering to stay late after work to teach him to dance.

Marian Freeman (Elaine Stritch), the older, experienced manager of the nightclub where Norah works, also takes a personal interest in Norah and tries to advise and protect her. She offers to spend the night with Norah at her apartment so Norah will not be alone and afraid. While Marian is visiting, Norah receives yet another telephone call and starts to cry. Marian consoles her, but Norah senses that Marian is actually making a lesbian pass at her and, revolted, asks her to leave the apartment immediately. Marian leaves in a huff, still wearing Norah's coat, which she had been using as a bathrobe. Lawrence, who is outside, sees Marian leaving in Norah's coat, and mistaking her for Norah, chases after her and kills her.

Lawrence finally attacks Norah after closing time in the empty nightclub and violently rapes her, but does not kill her. Lt. Madden, who has just figured out that Lawrence was watching Norah through the reflection of a mirror, arrives too late to save Norah from the rape. He beats Lawrence and then, inexplicably, lets him leave the club. Lawrence runs through traffic in Times Square imagining that he is running through Central Park towards a welcoming Norah. Police officers chase him and ultimately gun him down as the film ends.

Cast

 Sal Mineo as Lawrence Sherman
 Juliet Prowse as Norah Dain
 Jan Murray as Lt. Dave Madden
 Elaine Stritch as Marian Freeman
 Margot Bennett as Edie Sherman
 Dan Travanty as Carlo
 Diane Moore as Pam Madden
 Frank Campanella as Police Captain
 Bruce Glover as Frank
 Tom Aldredge as Adler
 Rex Everhart as Rude Customer
 Alex Fisher as Michel
 Stanley Beck as Sutter
 Casey Townsend as Ms. Nielsen

Production

Set in New York City, the film was shot on location in Manhattan and features footage of Times Square.

Reception

Author and film critic Leonard Maltin awarded the film one and a half out of four stars, calling it "sleazy", and "a waste of talent". It has gone on to develop a cult status among film students for its exploration of voyeurism, pornography as instigator of sex crimes, arson, masturbation, child abuse, transvestism, loneliness and lesbianism at a time when American and British films usually avoided these.

See also
List of American films of 1965

References

External links

 

1965 films
1965 crime drama films
1965 independent films
1965 LGBT-related films
1960s psychological thriller films
American black-and-white films
American crime drama films
American independent films
American LGBT-related films
American mystery films
American neo-noir films
American psychological thriller films
1960s English-language films
Films about rape
Films about stalking
Films set in New York City
Films shot in New York City
1960s American films